Ecce homo ("behold the man") are the Latin words used by Pontius Pilate in the Vulgate translation of the Gospel of John, when he presents a scourged Jesus, bound and crowned with thorns, to a hostile crowd shortly before his Crucifixion (John 19:5). The original , is rendered by most English Bible translations, e.g. Douay-Rheims Bible and King James Version, as "behold the man". The scene has been widely depicted in Christian art.

A scene of the ecce homo is a standard component of cycles illustrating the Passion and life of Christ in art. It follows the Flagellation of Christ, the crowning with thorns and the mocking of Jesus, the last two often being combined: The usual depiction shows Pilate and Jesus, a mocking crowd which may be rather large, and parts of the city of Jerusalem.

But, from the 15th century in the West, and much earlier in the art of the Eastern church, devotional pictures began to portray Jesus alone, in half or full figure with a purple robe, loincloth, crown of thorns and torture wounds, especially on his head, and later became referred to as images of the  Ecce homo. Similar subjects but with the wounds of the crucifixion visible (Nail wounds on the limbs, spear wounds on the sides), are termed a Man of Sorrows (also Misericordia). If the instruments of the Passion are present, it may be called an Arma Christi. If Christ is sitting down (usually supporting himself with his hand on his thigh), it may be referred to it as Christ at rest or Pensive Christ. It is not always possible to distinguish these subjects.

Eastern Christianity 
Narrative scenes of the biblical moment are almost never shown in Eastern art, but icons of the single figure of the tortured Christ go back over a millennium, and have sometimes been called Ecce homo images by later sources.  The first depictions of the ecce homo scene in the arts appear in the 9th and 10th centuries in the Syrian-Byzantine culture of the Antiochian Greek Christians.

Eastern Orthodox tradition generally refers to this type of icon by a different title: ″ ″.

The icon presents the bridegroom as a suffering Christ, mocked and humiliated by Pontius Pilate's soldiers before his crucifixion.

The daily Midnight Office summons the faithful to be ready at all times for the day of the Dread Judgement, which will come unexpectedly like "a bridegroom in the night". On Monday, Tuesday and Wednesday, the first three days of Passion Week, the last week before Pascha, consecrated to the commemoration of the last days of the earthly life of the Saviour, the troparion is chanted: "Behold the Bridegroom Cometh at Midnight".

A Passion Play, presented in Moscow (27 March 2007) and in Rome (29 March 2007), recalls the words, with which "in Holy Scriptures Christ describes Himself as a bridegroom":

Western Christianity 

Depictions of Western Christianity in the Middle Ages, e.g. the Egbert Codex and the Codex Aureus Epternacensis, seem to depict the ecce homo scene (and are usually interpreted as such), but more often than not only show the Crowning of thorns and the Mocking of Christ, which precede the actual ecce homo scene in the Bible. The independent image only developed around 1400, probably in Burgundy, but then rapidly became extremely popular, especially in Northern Europe.

The motif found increasing currency as the Passion became a central theme in Western piety in the 15th and 16th centuries. The ecce homo theme was included not only in the passion plays of medieval theatre, but also in cycles of illustrations of the story of the Passion, as in the Great Passion of Albrecht Dürer or the engravings of Martin Schongauer. The scene was (especially in France) often depicted as a sculpture or group of sculptures; even altarpieces and other paintings with the motif were produced (e.g. by Hieronymus Bosch or Hans Holbein). Like the passion plays, the visual depictions of the ecce homo scene, it has been argued, often, and increasingly, portray the people of Jerusalem in a highly critical light, bordering perhaps on antisemitic caricatures. Equally, this style of art has been read as a kind of simplistic externalisation of the inner hatred of the angry crowd towards Jesus, not necessarily implying any racial judgment.

The motif of the lone figure of a suffering Christ who seems to be staring directly at the observer, enabling him/her to personally identify with the events of the Passion, arose in the late Middle Ages. At the same time similar motifs of the Man of Sorrow and Christ at rest increased in importance. The subject was used repeatedly in later so-called old master prints (e.g. by Jacques Callot and Rembrandt), in the paintings of the Renaissance and the Baroque, as well as in Baroque sculptures.

Hieronymus Bosch painted his first Ecce Homo during the 1470s. He returned to the subject in 1490 to paint in a characteristically Netherlandish style, with deep perspective and a surreal ghostly image of praying monks in the lower left-hand corner.

In 1498, Albrecht Dürer depicted the suffering of Christ in the ecce homo of his Great Passion in unusually close relation with his self-portrait, leading to a reinterpretation of the motif as a metaphor for the suffering of the artist. James Ensor used the ecce homo motif in his ironic painting Christ and the Critics (1891), in which he portrayed himself as Christ.

Antonio Ciseri's 1871 Ecce Homo portrayal presents a semi-photographic view of a balcony seen from behind the central figures of a scourged Christ and Pilate (whose face is not visible). The crowd forms a distant mass, almost without individuality, and much of the detailed focus is on the normally secondary figures of Pilate's aides, guards, secretary and wife.

(146 cm x 96.5 cm, unsigned, painted between 1879 and 1881), was significant in Chmielowski's life, as it is in Act 1 of Wojtyła's play. Pope John Paul II is said to have kept a copy of this painting in his apartment at the Vatican. The original can be viewed in the Ecce Homo Sanctuary of the Albertine Sisters in Kraków. It was painted at a time when the painter was going through an inner struggle, trying to decide whether to remain an artist, or to give up painting to pursue the calling to minister to the poor.

Especially in the 19th and 20th centuries, the meaning of ecce homo motif has been extended to the portrayal of suffering and the degradation of humans through violence and war. Notable 20th-century depictions are George Grosz's (1922–1923) and Lovis Corinth's Ecce Homo (1925). The 84 drawings and 16 watercolors of Grosz criticize the socio-political conditions of the Weimar Republic. Corinth shows, from the perspective of the crowd, Jesus, a soldier, and Pilate dressed as a physician. Following the Holocaust of World War II, Otto Dix portrayed himself, in Ecce Homo with self-likeness behind barbed wire (1948), as the suffering Christ in a concentration camp.

Artworks 
These are images of the narrative type, with other figures, rather than the devotional Man of Sorrows type.
Ecce Homo (Bosch, 1470s), now Frankfurt
Ecce Homo (Bosch, 1490s), follower of Bosch, now Indianapolis and Philadelphia
Ecce homo (Mantegna), c. 1500, now Paris
Ecce Homo (Caravaggio), c. 1605, Genoa
Ecce Homo (Rubens), c. 1612 Hermitage Museum
Ecce Homo (Luini), before 1532, Cologne
Ecce Homo (Daumier), 1850, Essen

Gallery

Publications 

  — 
 
 
 
 
 
 
 
 
  . . . — 
  —  — .
  — 
 
 
 
  —

See also 
 Ecce Homo: How One Becomes What One Is
 Ecce homo qui est faba
 Ecce Mono

References

Notes

Further reading 

 

Christian terminology
Gospel of John
Gospel of Matthew
Iconography of Jesus
New Testament Latin words and phrases
 
Pontius Pilate
Vulgate Latin words and phrases